"Toxic Punk" is a song by American rapper YoungBoy Never Broke Again, released on February 4, 2021 as the lead single from his third studio album Sincerely, Kentrell (2021). It was produced by Jason "Cheese" Goldberg, DJ Trebble, Dmac and TnTXD. The title of the song, as well as one of the cover arts of the single, is a reference to the video game Cyberpunk 2077.

Composition
The song features a guitar-driven trap instrumental and a pop rock-inspired melody. NBA YoungBoy sing-raps about the effects that drugs, as well as a failed relationship, have had on his life. He reflects on all the positive things and events around him, but expresses that they do not mean much when he is missing his loved one.

Charts

Certifications

References

2021 singles
2021 songs
YoungBoy Never Broke Again songs
Songs written by YoungBoy Never Broke Again
Atlantic Records singles
Songs about drugs